Nicholas James Falkner (born 30 September 1962) is a former English cricketeer. Falkner was a right-handed batsman who bowled right-arm medium pace. He was born at Redhill, Surrey, and was educated at Reigate Grammar School.

Surrey
Falkner made his debut for Surrey against Glamorgan in a List A match in the 1984 John Player Special League, with him making a further List A appearance against Gloucestershire in that seasons Benson & Hedges Cup. In that same season he also made his first-class debut against Cambridge University, scoring a century on debut with a score of 101 not out in Surrey's first-innings, in a partnership of 198 with fellow debutant Keith Medlycott. The following season, he made just one appearance for Surrey, in a List A match against Gloucestershire in the 1985 John Player Special League.

In the 1986 season, he broke into Surrey's starting eleven for the County Championship, making eleven first-class appearances that season. He scored 567 runs at an average of 35.43, with a high score of 102 against Middlesex. He made four List A appearances in that season, against the touring Indians, as well as two matches against Derbyshire and Nottinghamshire in the NatWest Trophy and a single match against Hampshire in the John Player Special League. In the 1987 season, which was to be his last with Surrey, he made just four first-class appearances, against the touring Pakistanis and three appearances in the County Championship against Derbyshire, Warwickshire and Essex. He also appeared in five List A matches in the 1987 Benson & Hedges Cup, as well as two more in the Refuge Assurance League. Falkner played a total of sixteen first-class matches for the county, scoring 734 runs at an average of 34.95, scoring two centuries and two half centuries. In List A cricket, he made thirteen appearances, scoring 254 runs at an average of 23.09, with a high score of 58, which was one of two half centuries he made in that format.

Sussex
Having left Surrey, he joined Sussex for the 1988 season, making his debut for the county in a List A match against Essex in the 1988 Benson & Hedges Cup. He made two further List A appearances in that season, against Warwickshire and Northamptonshire in the Refuge Assurance League. His first-class debut for the county came against Yorkshire in the County Championship, with him making six further first-class appearances in that season, scoring 232 runs at an average of 16.57, with a high score of 58. The following season, he made two first-class appearances against Surrey and Warwickshire in the County Championship, as well as a third first-class appearance against Cambridge University. He also made three List A appearances, two in the Benson & Hedges Cup against Hampshire and Glamorgan, as well as one against Warwickshire in the Refuge Assurance League. Falkner played a total of ten first-class matches for Sussex, scoring 308 runs at an average of 17.11, making one half century score of 55. In List A cricket, he made six appearances, scoring 33 runs at an average of 5.50, with a high score of 15. He played some matches for the Sussex Second XI in 1990, but thereafter he was released by the county.

References

External links
Nick Falkner at ESPNcricinfo
Nick Falkner at CricketArchive

1962 births
Living people
People from Redhill, Surrey
People educated at Reigate Grammar School
English cricketers
Surrey cricketers
Sussex cricketers